The 2009 season of the FFAS Senior League was the twenty ninth season of association football competition in American Samoa. Black Roses won the championship, their first recorded title, with the winners of the 1998 league competition and a number of previous seasons unknown.

The league was initially intended to consist of a round robin group stage where all teams would play each other once. The top four teams would then qualify for one-legged semi finals to decide the two teams that would compete in the final for the championship. However, the final two rounds of the regular stage as well as the playoffs were cancelled. This was decided by the respective club presidents on October 13, 2009, due to damage at Pago Pago, the only regulation pitch, caused by the 2009 Samoa earthquake and tsunami.
Additionally four of the clubs are based in the villages: Fagasa, Leone and Pago Pago, were badly damaged by the tsunami.

League table

Results

Pool was played on a round robin basis, results are reported as per RSSSF, hence why some teams appear to have played more "home" games than others.

References

FFAS Senior League seasons
Amer
football